Paul Graham Wilson (born 1928) is an Australian botanist. As of 1998, Wilson was the most prolific contributor to the journal Nuytsia, contributing to the first issue in 1970 and to the 12th volume in 1998, which was dedicated to him for his contributions to plant taxonomy and to celebrate his 70th birthday. Since his retirement from the Western Australian Herbarium in 1993, he has helped to maintain a comprehensive census of the flora of Western Australia.

Wilson has mostly published papers dealing with the plant families Rutaceae, Asteraceae and Chenopodiaceae.

Selected publications
 A taxonomic revision of the genera Crowea, Eriostemon, and Phebalium (Rutaceae)
 A taxonomic review of the genera Eriostemon and Philotheca (Rutaceae: Boronieae).;
 New species and nomenclatural changes in Phebalium and related genera (Rutaceae);
 Rhetinocarpha (Asteraceae: Gnaphalieae) - a new genus from Western Australia;
 Coronidium, a new Australian genus in the Gnaphalieae (Asteraceae).

References

External links

1928 births
20th-century Australian botanists
Living people
Date of birth missing (living people)
Place of birth missing (living people)